A roller pigeon is a domesticated breed or variety of pigeon that has been selected for its ability to tumble or roll in the air.
Varieties of roller pigeons include:
Birmingham Roller
Galatz Roller
Oriental Roller
Parlor Roller

See also 
List of pigeon breeds
Tumbler pigeons

References

Domestic pigeons
Pigeon sport